Kaohsiung International Airport  is a medium-sized civil airport in Siaogang District, Kaohsiung, Taiwan, also known as Siaogang Airport. With nearly seven million passengers in 2018, it is the second busiest airport in Taiwan, after Taoyuan. The airport has a single east–west runway and two terminals: one international and one domestic.

History
Originally built as an Imperial Japanese Army Air Squadron base in 1942 during the Japanese rule era of Taiwan, Kaohsiung Airport retained its military purpose when the Republic of China government first took control of Taiwan in 1945. Due to the need for civil transportation in southern Taiwan, it was demilitarised and converted into a domestic civil airport in 1965, and further upgraded to the status an international airport in 1969, with regular international flights starting in 1972.

During the 1970s and 1980s, direct international flights were rare at the airport, with Hong Kong and Tokyo being the only two destinations. Since the early 1990s, dedicated connection flights to Taipei were inaugurated, bringing convenience to the south as Taipei had more international flights. These contributed to a steady growth in airport passenger and flight movements. A new terminal dedicated to international flights was opened in 1997.

In summer 1998, EVA Air opened a direct flight between Kaohsiung and Los Angeles, but it was discontinued only after six months. Northwest Airlines operated the Kaohsiung–Osaka route from 1999 to 2001, and the Tokyo route from 2002 to 2003. These two routes were separately suspended due to the low load caused by the September 11 attacks and SARS outbreak. 

After Taiwan High Speed Rail, the high speed rail line that runs between Taipei and Kaohsiung along Taiwan's western plains, began operation in January 2007, Kaohsiung Airport suffered large reduction in passenger and flight movements. The convenience of Taiwan High Speed Rail and record-high costs of jet fuel were eating up most load factors to Taipei, caused flights between cities on Taiwan's western plains to cease operation, with the last domestic flight between Taipei Songshan and Kaohsiung ceased operation on 31 August 2012. The dedicated international connecting flight between Kaohsiung and Taoyuan stopped on 1 July 2017, after over thirty years of operation.

Kaohsiung Airport has added direct flights to China's Hangzhou Xiaoshan International Airport, and has since added flights to Shenzhen, Shanghai, Fuzhou, Changsha, Beijing, Kunming, Zhengzhou, Guilin, Qingdao and Chengdu.

Since 2009, the number of passengers has been recovering due to the opening of regular scheduled cross-strait flights to China, as well as the rise of low cost carriers.

Terminals

Kaohsiung International Airport has two terminals – domestic and international. They are connected by a corridor.

The domestic terminal was built in 1965 when the facility was first opened as a civilian airport.  Through the years, it has undergone small expansions and improvements, but jet bridges have never been added. (The domestic terminal primarily serves smaller planes that do not require jet bridges.) The current domestic terminal building also served international flights before the opening of the new international terminal. The international terminal opened in 1997 and all gates have jet bridges. It serves all international and cross-strait flights to China. The floor area for the international terminal is three times more than that of the domestic one.

Airlines and destinations

Several airlines such as China Airlines and Uni Air operate charter flights from Kaohsiung to many Japanese cities including Asahikawa, Hakodate, Sapporo, Hanamaki, Obihiro, Nagasaki and Kumamoto, mostly during long vacations.

Statistics

Accidents and incidents
On 15 February 1969, a Douglas C-47B B-241 of Far Eastern Air Transport was damaged beyond economic repair in an accident at Kaohsiung International Airport.
On 27 June 1989, a Cessna 404 Titan of Formosa Airlines on its way to Wang-an, Penghu crashed into nearby Cianjhen District streets shortly after takeoff. All 12 people on board were killed; there were no ground casualties.
On 23 July 2014, TransAsia Airways Flight 222 took off from Kaohsiung International Airport bound for Magong. The ATR 72-500 crashed into buildings during a second attempt to land in bad weather. Of the 58 people on board, only 10 survived. 5 people on the ground were injured and the crash caused a fire involving two homes.

Ground transportation
Coach: There is a one-way coach from Kaohsiung International Airport to Fangliao and Kenting.
Local bus: Both terminals are served by local buses
Car rental: a car rental centre is located between the terminals, near the airport bus stop.
Taxis: Yellow taxis are available. A roaming taxi stop is at right side of International Terminal. There are also 2 Queuing taxi stops at the airport, one is at left side of International Terminal, another one is at the left side of Domestic Terminal.

See also
 Civil Aeronautics Administration (Taiwan)
 Transportation in Taiwan
 List of airports in Taiwan

Footnotes

References

External links

Kaohsiung International Airport Official website
Guide to Kaohsiung Airport
Office of “E-VAT Refund”

1942 establishments in Taiwan
Airports established in 1942
Airports in Kaohsiung